The World Federation of Diamond Bourses, founded in 1947, was created to provide bourses trading in rough and polished diamonds and precious stones with a common set of trading practices. It is composed of 30 member diamond bourses. Their headquarters are in Antwerp. Members of The World Federation of Diamond Bourses (WFDB) act as a medium for wholesale diamond exchange, trading both polished and rough diamonds. The WFDB consists of independent diamond bourses in major centers of the diamond trade such as Tel Aviv, Antwerp, Mumbai, Johannesburg, London and New York and other cities across the USA, Europe and Asia. The WFDB provides a legal framework and convenes to enact regulations for its members. The following is a list of the 30 bourses.

Antwerpsche Diamantkring CVBA (Belgium)
Bangkok Diamonds and Precious Stones Exchange (Thailand)
Beurs voor Diamanthandel CVBA (Belgium)
Bharat Diamond Bourse (India)
Borsa Diamanti D'Italia (Italy)
Borsa Istanbul (Turkey)
Diamant- und Edelsteinbörse E.V. (Germany)
Diamant- Club Wien (Austria)
Diamantclub van Antwerpen CVBA (Belgium)
Diamond Bourse of Canada
Diamond Bourse of Southeast United States, Inc.
Diamond Chamber of Russia
Diamond Club West Coast, Inc. (United States)
Diamond Dealers Club of New York (United States) -Based in the Diamond District in Midtown Manhattan, NY
Diamond Dealers Club of Australia
Diamond Dealers Club of South Africa
Diamond Exchange of Singapore
Dubai Diamond Exchange
Hong Kong Diamond Bourse Ltd. (People's Republic of China)
The Israel Diamond Exchange Ltd.
The Israel Precious Stones and Diamonds Exchange Ltd.
Korea Diamond Bourse
The London Diamond Bourse (United Kingdom)
Moscow Diamond Bourse (Russian Federation)
The New Israel Club for Commerce in Diamonds Ltd.
Panama Diamond Exchange
Shanghai Diamond Exchange (People's Republic of China)
Tokyo Diamond Exchange Inc. (Japan)
Vereniging Beurs voor den Diamanthandel (Netherlands)
Vrije Diamanthandel NV (Belgium)

Associated member:
 The Gem and Jewellery Export Promotion Council India (GJEPC)
 Hong Kong Indian Diamond Association (HKIDA)

See also
 Diamond Exchange District
 World Diamond Congress
 Blood diamond
 Diamonds as an investment

References

External links
 

International organisations based in Belgium
International trade organizations

Organizations established in 1947